"Sweet Inspiration" is a song by American soul group Johnny Johnson and the Bandwagon, released as a single in May 1970 as the first single from their second album Soul Survivor. It peaked at number 10 on the UK Singles Chart, becoming their second top-ten hit there.

Release
Due to the group's lack of success in the US compared to the UK (where "Breakin' Down the Walls of Heartache" was a top 5 hit), the group had relocated to the UK. Therefore, "Sweet Inspiration" was released there first in May 1970, before being in the US in July. The B-side, "Pride Comes Before a Fall", was written by Jacky Arthur and Mel Kent.

Track listing
7"
 "Sweet Inspiration" – 3:05
 "Pride Comes Before a Fool" – 2:40

Charts

Cover versions
 In July 1970, Cilla Black released a version of the song on her album of the same name.
 A version by Dusty Springfield was recorded in June 1970, but was not released at the time. It has since been released on various compilation albums.

References

1970 singles
1970 songs
Bell Records singles
Cilla Black songs
Songs written by John Cameron (musician)